The 2006 PapaJohns.com Bowl was the inaugural postseason college football match of the game, between the South Florida Bulls and the East Carolina Pirates at Legion Field in Birmingham, Alabama. The University of South Florida represented the Big East Conference and East Carolina University represented Conference USA. The game  resulted in a 24–7 South Florida victory.

In the inaugural game, South Florida's Benjamin Williams scored the game's first points just over ninety seconds into the game as one of his two touchdowns on the day, and earned the game's MVP honors. Notably, South Florida had previously been a member of C-USA. Moreover, East Carolina's then head coach Skip Holtz, would later become USF head coach Jim Leavitt's successor following the 2009 season.

References

PapaJohns.com Bowl
Birmingham Bowl
South Florida Bulls football bowl games
East Carolina Pirates football bowl games
December 2006 sports events in the United States
PapaJohns.com